This is a list of local Farmers Markets in Indiana

Greater Indianapolis Area

Greater Lafayette Area

Evansville / Tri-State Area

Fort Wayne 

Indiana
Indiana-related lists